1,2,3,4,6-Pentagalloylglucose is the pentagallic acid ester of glucose. It is a gallotannin and the precursor of ellagitannins.

Pentagalloyl glucose can precipitate proteins, including human salivary α-amylase.

Natural occurrence 
1,2,3,4,6-Pentagalloyl glucose can be found in Punica granatum (pomegranate), Elaeocarpus sylvestris, Rhus typhina (Staghorn sumac), Paeonia suffruticosa (Tree Peony),., Mangifera indica (mango)  and Bouea macrophylla Griffith (maprang).

Biosynthesis 
The enzyme beta-glucogallin-tetrakisgalloylglucose O-galloyltransferase uses 1-O-galloyl-beta-D-glucose and 1,2,3,6-tetrakis-O-galloyl-beta-D-glucose to produce D-glucose and pentagalloyl glucose.

Metabolism 

Tellimagrandin II is formed from pentagalloyl glucose by oxidative dehydrogenation and coupling of 2 galloyl groups.

β-glucogallin: 1,2,3,4,6-pentagalloyl-β-d-glucose galloyltransferase is an enzyme found in the leaves of Rhus typhina that catalyzes the galloylation of 1,2,3,4,6-penta-O-galloyl-β-D-glucose to 3-O-digalloyl-1,2,4,6-tetra-O-galloyl-β-d-glucose (hexa-galloylglucose).

Chemistry 
Pentagalloyl glucose can undergo oxidation reactions which are depending on the pH.

Research
Pentagalloyl glucose has been studied for its potential use as an antimicrobial, anti-inflammatory, anticarcinogenic, antidiabetic, and antioxidant. It has also been studied for radioprotection. This compound helps stabilize the elastin and collagen in vascular tissues and restores the biomechanical properties of arterial ECM. In addition, pentagalloyl glucose has shown to reduce arterial calcification and helps promote extracellular matrix preservation in animal models of abdominal aortic aneurysm. In vitro studies with  mouse C2C12 myoblast cells have shown the PGG helps in lowering reactive oxygen species (ROS) and  matrix metalloproteinase-2 (MMP-2) expression in a dose-dependent manner.

References 

Gallotannins
Trihydroxybenzoic acids
Pyrogallols